The Leap may refer to:
 The Leap, Queensland, a coastal rural locality in the Mackay Region, Queensland, Australia
 The Leap (novel), a 2001 novel by Jonathan Stroud
 The Leap (How I Met Your Mother), an episode of the TV series How I Met Your Mother
 The Divine and the Decay, a 1957 novel by Bill Hopkins., republished as The Leap

See also
 Leap (disambiguation)